Rhynchomolpus is a genus of leaf beetles in the subfamily Eumolpinae. It is distributed in New Guinea, and the name refers to its resemblance to a snout beetle.

Species
 Rhynchomolpus curculionoides Gressitt, 1969
 Rhynchomolpus ptinoides Gressitt, 1969

References

Eumolpinae
Chrysomelidae genera
Beetles of Oceania
Insects of New Guinea
Endemic fauna of New Guinea